Cape Angela is a rocky headland in Bizerte, Tunisia. Its tip, Ras Ben Sakka, has been considered the northernmost point of the African continent since 2014, replacing Cape Blanc (Ras al-Abyad), also in Tunisia.

References

Angela